Denis Gremelmayr was the defending champion, but decided not to participate.
Igor Kunitsyn won the title, defeating Rainer Schüttler 6–2, 7–6(2) in the final.

Seeds

Draw

Finals

Top half

Bottom half

References
 Main Draw
 Qualifying Draw

Trofeo Paolo Corazzi - Singles
Trofeo Paolo Corazzi